The Ukrainian Cup was the national ice hockey cup competition in Ukraine. It was only held in 2007, and was won by HC Sokil Kyiv.

2007 tournament
Six teams participated in the competition. They were divided into two groups, with the top team in each group qualifying for the final.

First round

Group A

Group B

Final
HC Berkut - HC Sokil Kyiv 3:7 (1:4, 0:2, 2:1)

External links
Ukrainian Ice Hockey Federation

Defunct national ice hockey cup competitions in Europe
Cup
2007 in Ukrainian sport
2007 in ice hockey